The team dressage event, part of the equestrian program at the 1996 Summer Olympics was held on 27 July 1996 at the Georgia International Horse Park, in Conyers, Georgia. The results of the first round of the individual dressage were used to award rankings.  Like all other equestrian events, the dressage competition was mixed gender, with both male and female athletes competing in the same division.  Nine teams, each consisting of four horse and rider pairs, entered the contest.

Medalists

Results

References

Source: Official Report of the 1996 Sydney Summer Olympics available at  https://web.archive.org/web/20060622162855/http://www.la84foundation.org/5va/reports_frmst.htm

Team